Caren Kaplan is a professor of American Studies at University of California at Davis, and a prominent figure in the academic discipline of women's studies. Together with Inderpal Grewal, Kaplan is best known for her work as a founder of the field of transnational feminist cultural studies or transnational feminism.  Kaplan is a proponent of the digital humanities and has turned the critical lens of cultural studies upon topics such as travel, visual culture, militarization and the construction of consumer subjects. Her book 'Questions of Travel' has been highly influential in the development of a social science attentive to the role of travel and mobility in everyday life and contemporary culture.

Kaplan graduated from Hampshire College in 1977 with a degree in social theory and received her Ph.D. in 1987 from the History of Consciousness program at the University of California at Santa Cruz.  She wrote her dissertation, The Poetics of Displacement: Exile, Immigration, and Travel in Contemporary Autobiographical Writing, under the direction of James Clifford, Donna Haraway, and Teresa de Lauretis.  Before accepting her position at UC Davis, Kaplan held teaching appointments at the University of California Berkeley and Georgetown University.  In 2006-2007, she won the prestigious Digital Innovation Fellowship from the American Council of Learned Societies.  Kaplan was the founder of the Designated Emphasis on Women, Gender and Sexuality at UC Berkeley when she was a professor there and heavily influenced a new generation of scholars including such figures as Jasbir Puar.

Notes

Books 

Caren Kaplan, Questions of Travel: Postmodern Discourses of Displacement, Duke University Press, 1996.
Caren Kaplan and Inderpal Grewal, An Introduction to Women's Studies: Gender in a Transnational World,  McGraw-Hill Humanities/Social Sciences/Languages, September 25, 2001 (Second edition 2005)
Caren Kaplan, Norma Alarcón and Minoo Moallem. Between Woman and Nation: Transnational Feminisms and the State, Duke University Press, 1999.
Caren Kaplan and Inderpal Grewal, Scattered Hegemonies: Postmodernity and Transnational Feminist Practices, (University of Minnesota Press, 1994)

Caren Kaplan multimedia projects 
Dead Reckoning: Aerial Perception and the Social Construction of Targets

External links 
Caren Kaplan's Faculty Webpage
CAREN KAPLAN: EVERYTHING IS CONNECTED: AERIAL PERSPECTIVES, THE REVOLUTION
Caren Kaplan website

University of California, Davis faculty
Living people
Women's studies academics
Year of birth missing (living people)
University of California, Santa Cruz alumni